Ronald Welty (born February 1, 1971) is an American musician and the former drummer for the American punk rock band The Offspring. After The Offspring, Welty formed Steady Ground.

Career

The Offspring 
In July 1987, 16-year-old Welty joined The Offspring, replacing James Lilja.

Welty performed on The Offspring's first six studio albums: The Offspring, Ignition, Smash, Ixnay on the Hombre, Americana, and Conspiracy of One. He was fired from the band in 2003 when they were in the midst of writing and recording Splinter. Of all the band's drummers, Welty's tenure of almost 16 years remains the longest. In September 2020, Welty filed a lawsuit against The Offspring for unpaid royalties.

Steady Ground 
After The Offspring, Welty formed Steady Ground, in which he played drums and co-produced.

On February 26, 2006, Steady Ground released three demos on Myspace, entitled "Everyone's Emotional", "I Can't Contain Myself", and "You Better Close Your Eyes." In 2007, the band released the studio album Jettison, and in the same year they broke up.

References

External links

1971 births
American punk rock drummers
American male drummers
Living people
The Offspring members
Musicians from Long Beach, California
20th-century American drummers
21st-century American drummers